Riedbach is a municipality  in the district of Haßberge in Bavaria in Germany. It is situated 20 km northeast of Schweinfurt and 8 km north of Haßfurt.

The municipality was created in 1978. It encompasses the villages of Humprechtshausen, Kleinmünster, Kleinsteinach, Kreuzthal and Mechenried, and derives its name from the Riedbach creek that flows through Humprechtshausen, Kleinsteinach and Mechenried. 
The population of Riedbach is about 1600 people. Its mayor is Birgit Bayer.

Villages 
Humprechtshausen (521 Inhabitants)
Mechenried (461 Inhabitants)
Kleinsteinach (441 Inhabitants)
Kleinmünster (259 Inhabitants)
Kreuzthal (104 Inhabitants)

Neighboring municipalities 
Riedbach is surrounded by the municipalities (beginning north, clockwise) of Aidhausen, Hofheim in Unterfranken, Königsberg in Bayern, Haßfurt and Schonungen.

History 
In 1818, as part of the reformation of the Bavarian territories, the municipalities of Kleinmünster, Kleinsteinach, Mechenried and Humprechtshausen (with its district Kreuzthal) were created. On 1 May 1978 as part of another reformation of the Bavarian territories, the former municipalities formed the municipality "Riedbach".

Population 
1910: 1.725 Inhabitants
1972: 1.902 Inhabitants
2005: 1.717 Inhabitants
2010: 1.625 Inhabitants

Economy 
Riedbach's main economy is agriculture, with 72 producers. Additionally, there are six construction companies and two kindergartens.

References

External links 
 Gemeinde Riedbach The Municipality Riedbach (in German)
 Wikimedia Commons of Riedbach Collection of Images of Riedbach
 Familieneinladungen.de GmbH A company situated in Riedbach (in German)
 Riedbach (Statistics) Official statistics of Riedbach by the Bavarian State (in German)

Haßberge (district)